Deep clean or deep cleaning may refer to:

Deep clean (COVID-19), a sanitation technology
Deep Cleaning, an episode of Superstore (season 6)
Scaling and root planing, also known as deep cleaning

See also
Domestic deep cleaning
Commercial cleaning
Floor cleaning
Terminal cleaning